From June 2010, to the end of 2019, Falcon 9 was launched 77 times, with 75 full mission successes, one partial failure and one total loss of the spacecraft. In addition, one rocket and its payload were destroyed on the launch pad during the fueling process before a static fire test was set to occur. Falcon Heavy was launched three times, all successful.

The first Falcon 9 version, Falcon 9 v1.0, was launched five times from June 2010, to March 2013, its successor Falcon 9 v1.1 15 times from September 2013, to January 2016, and the Falcon 9 Full Thrust (through Block 4) 36 times from December 2015, to June 2018. The latest Full Thrust variant, Block 5, was introduced in May 2018, and launched 21 times until the end of 2019.

Statistics

Rocket configurations

Launch sites

Launch outcomes

Booster landings

Launches

2010 to 2013

2014 
With six launches, SpaceX became the second most prolific American company in terms of 2014, launches, behind Atlas V launch vehicle.

2015 
With 7 launches in 2015, Falcon 9 was the second most launched American rocket behind Atlas V.

2016 
With 8 successful launches for 2016, SpaceX equalled Atlas V for most American rocket launches for the year.

2017 
With 18 launches throughout 2017, SpaceX had the most prolific yearly launch manifest of all rocket families. Five launches in 2017, used pre-flown boosters.

2018 
In November 2017, Gwynne Shotwell expected to increase launch cadence in 2018, by about 50% compared to 2017, leveling out at a rate of about 30 to 40 per year, not including launches for the planned SpaceX satellite constellation Starlink. The actual launch rate increased by 17% from 18 in 2017, to 21 in 2018, giving SpaceX the second most launches for the year for a rocket family, behind China's Long March. Falcon Heavy made its first flight.

2019 
Shotwell stated in May 2019, that SpaceX might conduct up to 21 launches in 2019, not counting Starlink missions. With a slump in worldwide commercial launch contracts for 2019, SpaceX ended up launching only 13 launch vehicles throughout 2019, (11 without Starlink), significantly fewer than in 2017, and 2018, and third most launches of vehicle class behind China's Long March and Russia's R-7 launch vehicles.

Notable launches

First flight of Falcon 9 

On 4 June 2010, the first Falcon 9 launch successfully placed a test payload into the intended orbit. Starting at the moment of liftoff, the booster experienced roll. The roll stopped before the craft reached the top of the tower, but the second stage began to roll near the end of its burn, tumbling out of control during the passivation process and creating a gaseous halo of vented propellant that could be seen from all of Eastern Australia, raising UFO concerns.

COTS demonstration flights 

Second launch of Falcon 9 was COTS Demo Flight 1, which placed an operational Dragon capsule in a roughly  orbit on 8 December 2010, The capsule re-entered the atmosphere after two orbits, allowing testing for the pressure vessel integrity, attitude control using the Draco thrusters, telemetry, guidance, navigation, control systems, and the PICA-X heat shield, and intended to test the parachutes at speed. The capsule was recovered off the coast of Mexico and then placed on display at SpaceX headquarters.

The remaining objectives of the NASA COTS qualification program were combined into a single Dragon C2+ mission, on the condition that all milestones would be validated in space before berthing Dragon to the ISS. The Dragon capsule was propelled to orbit on 22 May, and for the next days tested its positioning system, solar panels, grapple fixture, proximity navigation sensors, and its rendezvous capabilities at safe distances. It was released on 31 May and successfully completed all the return procedures, and the recovered Dragon C2+ capsule is now on display at Kennedy Space Center. Falcon 9 and Dragon thus became the first fully commercially developed launcher to deliver a payload to the International Space Station, paving the way for SpaceX and NASA to sign the first Commercial Resupply Services agreement for 12 cargo deliveries.

CRS-1 

First operational cargo resupply mission to ISS, the fourth flight of Falcon 9, was launched on 7 October 2012. At 76 seconds after liftoff, engine 1 of the first stage suffered a loss of pressure which caused an automatic shutdown of that engine, but the remaining eight first-stage engines continued to burn and the Dragon capsule reached orbit successfully and thus demonstrated the rocket's "engine out" capability in flight. Due to ISS visiting vehicle safety rules, at NASA's request, the secondary payload Orbcomm-2 was released into a lower-than-intended orbit. The mission continued to rendezvous and berth the Dragon capsule with the ISS where the ISS crew unloaded its payload and reloaded the spacecraft with cargo for return to Earth. Despite the incident, Orbcomm said they gathered useful test data from the mission and planned to send more satellites via SpaceX, which happened in July 2014, and December 2015.

Maiden flight of v1.1 

Following unsuccessful attempts at recovering the first stage with parachutes, SpaceX upgraded to much larger first stage booster and with greater thrust, termed Falcon 9 v1.1 (also termed Block 2). SpaceX performed its first, demonstration flight of this version on 29 September 2013, with CASSIOPE as a primary payload. This had a payload mass that is very small relative to the rocket's capability, and was launched at a discounted rate, approximately 20% of the normal published price.  After the second stage separation, SpaceX conducted a novel high-altitude, high-velocity flight test, wherein the booster attempted to reenter the lower atmosphere in a controlled manner and decelerate to a simulated over-water landing.

Loss of CRS-7 mission 

On 28 June 2015, Falcon 9 Flight 19 carried a Dragon capsule on the seventh Commercial Resupply Services mission to the ISS. The second stage disintegrated due to an internal helium tank failure while the first stage was still burning normally. This was the first (and only as of February 2022) primary mission loss for any Falcon 9 rocket. In addition to ISS consumables and experiments, this mission carried the first International Docking Adapter (IDA-1), whose loss delayed preparedness of the station's US Orbital Segment (USOS) for future crewed missions.

Performance was nominal until T+140 seconds into launch when a cloud of white vapor appeared, followed by rapid loss of second-stage LOX tank pressure. The booster continued on its trajectory until complete vehicle breakup at T+150 seconds. The Dragon capsule was ejected from the disintegrating rocket and continued transmitting data until impact with the ocean. SpaceX officials stated that the capsule could have been recovered if the parachutes had deployed; however, the Dragon software did not include any provisions for parachute deployment in this situation. Subsequent investigations traced the cause of the accident to the failure of a strut that secured a helium bottle inside the second-stage LOX tank. With the helium pressurization system integrity breached, excess helium quickly flooded the tank, eventually causing it to burst from overpressure. NASA's independent accident investigation into the loss of SpaceX CRS-7 found that the failure of the strut which led to the breakup of the Falcon-9 represented a design error. Specifically, that industrial grade stainless steel had been used in a critical load path under cryogenic conditions and flight conditions, without additional part screening, and without regard to manufacturer recommendations.

Full-thrust version and first booster landings 

After pausing launches for months, SpaceX launched on 22 December 2015, the highly anticipated return-to-flight mission after the loss of CRS-7. This launch inaugurated a new Falcon 9 Full Thrust version (also initially termed Block 3) of its flagship rocket featuring increased performance, notably thanks to subcooling of the propellants. After launching a constellation of 11 Orbcomm-OG2 second-generation satellites, the first stage performed a controlled-descent and landing test for the eighth time, SpaceX attempted to land the booster on land for the first time. It managed to return the first stage successfully to the Landing Zone 1 at Cape Canaveral, marking the first successful recovery of a rocket first stage that launched a payload to orbit. After recovery, the first stage booster performed further ground tests and then was put on permanent display outside SpaceX's headquarters in Hawthorne, California.

On 8 April 2016, SpaceX delivered its commercial resupply mission to the International Space Station marking the return-to-flight of the Dragon capsule, after the loss of CRS-7. After separation, the first-stage booster slowed itself with a boostback maneuver, re-entered the atmosphere, executed an automated controlled descent and landed vertically onto the drone ship Of Course I Still Love You, marking the first successful landing of a rocket on a ship at sea. This was the fourth attempt to land on a drone ship, as part of the company's experimental controlled-descent and landing tests.

Loss of AMOS-6 on the launch pad 

On 1 September 2016, the 29th Falcon 9 rocket exploded on the launchpad while propellant was being loaded for a routine pre-launch static fire test. The payload, Israeli satellite AMOS-6, partly commissioned by Facebook, was destroyed with the launcher. On 2 January 2017, SpaceX released an official statement indicating that the cause of the failure was a buckled liner in several of the COPV tanks, causing perforations that allowed liquid and/or solid oxygen to accumulate underneath the COPVs carbon strands, which were subsequently ignited possibly due to friction of breaking strands.

Inaugural reuse of the first stage 

On 30 March 2017, Flight 32 launched the SES-10 satellite with the first-stage booster B1021, which had been previously used for the CRS-8 mission a year earlier. The stage was successfully recovered a second time and was retired and put on display at Cape Canaveral Air Force Station.

Zuma launch controversy 

Zuma was a classified United States government satellite and was developed and built by Northrop Grumman at an estimated cost of US$3.5 billion. Its launch, originally planned for mid-November 2017, was postponed to 8 January 2018, as fairing tests for another SpaceX customer were assessed. Following a successful Falcon 9 launch, the first-stage booster landed at LZ-1. Unconfirmed reports suggested that the Zuma spacecraft was lost, with claims that either the payload failed following orbital release, or that the customer-provided adapter failed to release the satellite from the upper stage, while other claims argued that Zuma was in orbit and operating covertly. SpaceX's COO Gwynne Shotwell stated that their Falcon 9 "did everything correctly" and that "Information published that is contrary to this statement is categorically false". A preliminary report indicated that the payload adapter, modified by Northrop Grumman after purchasing it from a subcontractor, failed to separate the satellite from the second stage under the zero gravity conditions. Due to the classified nature of the mission, no further official information is expected.

Falcon Heavy test flight 

The maiden launch of the Falcon Heavy occurred on 6 February 2018, marking the launch of the most powerful rocket since the Saturn V, with a theoretical payload capacity to low Earth orbit more than double the Delta IV Heavy. Both side boosters landed nearly simultaneously after a ten-minute flight. The central core failed to land on a floating platform at sea. The rocket carried a car and a mannequin to an eccentric heliocentric orbit that reaches further than the aphelion of Mars.

Maiden flight Crew Dragon and first crewed flight

On 2 March 2019, SpaceX launched its first orbital flight of Dragon 2 (Crew Dragon). It was an uncrewed mission to the International Space Station. The Dragon contained a mannequin named Ripley which was equipped with multiple sensors to gather data about how a human would feel during the flight. Along with the mannequin was 300 pounds of cargo of food and other supplies. Also on board was Earth plush toy referred to as a 'Super high tech zero-g indicator'. The toy became a hit with astronaut Anne McClain who showed the plushy on the ISS each day and also deciding to keep it on board to experience the crewed SpX-DM2.

The Dragon spent six days in space including five docked to the International Space Station. During the time, various systems were tested to make sure the vehicle was ready for US astronauts Doug Hurley and Bob Behnken to fly in it in 2020. SpaceX held a successful launch of the first commercial orbital human space flight on 30 May 2020, crewed with NASA astronauts Doug Hurley and Bob Behnken. Both astronauts focused on conducting tests on the Crew Dragon capsule. Crew Dragon successfully returned to Earth, splashing down in the Gulf of Mexico on 2 August 2020.

Booster reflight records 

Most records  were set during launches of Starlink satellites.

On 3 December 2018, Spaceflight SSO-A  launched on B1046. It was the first commercial mission to use a booster flying for the third time.

See also 
 List of Falcon 1 launches
 List of Falcon 9 first-stage boosters
 List of SpaceX Dragon 1 missions
 List of SpaceX Dragon 2 missions
 List of Starlink flights
 List of SpaceX Starship flight tests

Notes

References 

Falcon 9
Falcon Heavy

Falcon 9
Articles containing video clips
2010s in spaceflight
SpaceX related lists